Veikko Aarne Aleks Huhtanen (5 June 1919 – 29 January 1976) was a Finnish artistic gymnast. He was the most successful gymnast at the 1948 Summer Olympics by taking home five medals, including three gold medals. In the pommel horse event Huhtanen and two other Finns, Heikki Savolainen and Paavo Aaltonen, had the same score and the gold medal was shared between the three.

Huhtanen won two silver medals at the 1950 World Championships, in horizontal bar and with a team. Domestically he won only one individual title, in horizontal bar in 1948. Huhtanen retired after failing to qualify for the 1952 Olympics. He later worked as a machine operator in a factory and remained involved with gymnastics as a referee.

References

External links
 
 

1919 births
1976 deaths
Sportspeople from Vyborg
Finnish male artistic gymnasts
Gymnasts at the 1948 Summer Olympics
Olympic gymnasts of Finland
Olympic gold medalists for Finland
Olympic silver medalists for Finland
Olympic bronze medalists for Finland
Olympic medalists in gymnastics
Medalists at the 1948 Summer Olympics
Medalists at the World Artistic Gymnastics Championships
20th-century Finnish people